Tito Davison (14 November 1912 – 21 March 1985) was a Chilean-born Mexican film director and screenwriter. He directed more than 60 films between 1937 and 1982.

Selected filmography
 Thus Is Life (1930)
 Shadows of Glory (1930)
 Murió el sargento Laprida (1937)
 Educating Niní (1940)
 He Who Died of Love (1945)
 ¡Ay qué rechula es Puebla! (1946)
 Ramona (1946)
 The Golden Boat (1947)
 The Private Life of Mark Antony and Cleopatra (1947)
 Midnight (1949)
 The Devil Is a Woman (1950)
 Women Without Tomorrow (1951)
 When I Leave (1954)
 The Price of Living (1954)
 La Dulce Enemiga (1957)
 The White Sister (1960)
 Love in the Shadows (1960)
 Corazón salvaje (1968)
 The Big Cube (1969)

External links

1912 births
1985 deaths
Best Director Ariel Award winners
Chilean emigrants to Mexico
Chilean film directors
Chilean screenwriters
Male screenwriters
Mexican male screenwriters
Chilean male film actors
Mexican film directors
Mexican male film actors
People from Chillán
20th-century Mexican male actors
20th-century Mexican screenwriters
20th-century Mexican male writers